This article shows the women's tournament at the 2011 Pan Arab Games. Only men participated in this first edition of beach volleyball at the Pan Arab Games.

Preliminary round

Pool A

Pool B

 Elmi & Saleh disqualified so their results are not counted

Pool C

Pool D

 Abdulmajieid & Al Shayji disqualified so their results are not counted

Final round

References

2011
2011
2011 in beach volleyball
Events at the 2011 Pan Arab Games